The Roeper School is a private coeducational day school, with campuses in Birmingham and Bloomfield Hills, Michigan in Greater Detroit, serving students at all levels from preschool through the 12th grade. It was formerly known as Roeper City and Country School.

History
The Roeper School was founded in 1941 by George and Annemarie Roeper, who were forced to flee Nazi Germany. At the time the Roepers fled Europe, Annemarie had been invited by Anna Freud to be her protégé and, in fact, had completed her first year of medical school.

Together the Roepers founded the school intending it to be a place that, by teaching personal motivation and encouraging critical thinking skills and analysis, would educate children who would not follow leadership blindly as they believed had happened to many people in interwar Germany. It was also hoped the children would come to recognize the inherent dignity of every individual and to not harbor prejudice.

The school first moved to the Bloomfield Hills campus in 1946 and was designated a school for gifted children in 1956. In 1965 the Upper School (high school) program was added, and in 1981, the middle and upper schools moved to the former Adams Elementary School in Birmingham, Michigan, thereby creating two campuses. The Capital Campaign fundraising initiative began in the mid-nineties and has provided the school with its largest investment in new facilities, including a new elementary school classroom building that sits adjacent to the new community center that houses the school's first full size gymnasium, and the lower school's first large choir and band rooms.

Notable alumni
Flavia Colgan, political activist and analyst
 Tiffany P. Cunningham, a United States Circuit Judge of the United States Court of Appeals for the Federal Circuit
John Marshall Jones, actor
 Sharon LaFraniere (class of 1973), journalist
Dwayne McDuffie, comic book and animation writer
Richard R. Murray, founder of Equity Schools
Susan Shapiro, author and writing teacher
Angela V. Shelton, actress and comedian
Bahni Turpin, actress and audiobook narrator
Matt Wayne, television and comic book writer
Kayden Pierre, professional soccer player
Charlie White (class of 2005), Olympic ice dancer
Mark Zbikowski (class of 1974), Microsoft programmer, designer of the DOS executable file format

References

External links

 
Official school history website

Gifted education
Private high schools in Michigan
Schools in Oakland County, Michigan
High schools in Oakland County, Michigan
Bloomfield Hills, Michigan
Preparatory schools in Michigan
Educational institutions established in 1941
Private middle schools in Michigan
Private elementary schools in Michigan
1941 establishments in Michigan